Maik Krahberg (born 1971) is a German artistic gymnast. He won the bronze medal on floor exercise at the 1992 World Artistic Gymnastics Championships in Paris, finishing behind Ihor Korobchynskyi and Vitaly Scherbo.

References 

Living people
1971 births
German male artistic gymnasts
Sportspeople from Halle (Saale)
Medalists at the World Artistic Gymnastics Championships
20th-century German people
21st-century German people